This is a list of mausolea around the world.

Afghanistan

Albania 
 Mausoleum of the Albanian Royal Family
 National Martyrs Cemetery of Albania

Algeria 
 El Alia Cemetery

Angola

Azerbaijan
 Pir-Hussein Mausoleum
 Nizami Mausoleum (Ganja)
 Mausoleum of Seyid Yahya Bakuvi in the Palace of the Shirvanshahs (Baku)
 Tomb of Shirvanshahs in the Palace of the Shirvanshahs (Baku)
 Momine Khatun Mausoleum (Nakhchivan)
 Yusif ibn Kuseyir Mausoleum (Nakhchivan)
 Huseyn Javid Mausoleum (Nakhchivan)
 Prophet Noah Mausoleum (Nakhchivan)
 Shamakhi mausoleum (Şamaxı)
 Seyyid Amin Mausoleum (Beylagan Rayon)
 Kerbalai Seyyid Agha Mausoleum (Beylagan Rayon)
 Sheikh Badraddin Mausoleum, Sheikh Mansur Mausoleum, Sheikh Mahomed Mausoleum (Həzrə, Qabala Rayon)
 Haji Mahmud Effendi Mausoleum or Blue mausoleum (Aslanbəyli, Qazakh Rayon)
 Mausoleum Mollaverdi (Goranboy Rayon)
 Sheikh Zayed and Seyyid Khalife Mausoleums  (Lankaran Rayon)
 Yeddi Gumbez Mausoleum (Şamaxı)
 Naimi Mausoleum (Xanəgah, Julfa Rayon)
 Garabaghlar Mausoleum (Qarabağlar, Kangarli Rayon)
 Çalxanqala Mausoleum (Çalxanqala, Kangarli Rayon)
 Javad Khan Mausoleum (Ganja)
 Diri Baba Mausoleum (Qobustan)
 Vagif Mausoleum (Shusha)
 Mirza Adigezal bey Mausoleum (Rəhimli, Goranboy Rayon)
 Yahya ibn Muhammad al-Haj Mausoleum (Məmmədbəyli, Zangilan Rayon)
 Barda Mausoleum (Barda)
 Akhsatan Baba Mausoleum (Barda Rayon)
 Heydar Almazov Mausoleum (Neftchala Rayon)
 Siradzhaddin Agha Mausoleum (Samukh Rayon)
 Anagid Mausoleum (Çaykənd, Goygol Rayon)
 Sheikh Yusif Mausoleum (Şıxlar, Khachmaz Rayon)
 Kələxana Mausoleums (Shamakhi Rayon)
 Pirmərdəkan Mausoleum (Göylər, Shamakhi Rayon)
 Baba Samad Mausoleum (Rüdəkənar, Masally Rayon)
 Gharib Seyyid Mausoleum (Şatıroba, Masally Rayon)
 Baba Amir Mausoleum (Masally Rayon)
 Khalil Mausoleum (Siyəzən)
 Subaby Mausoleum (Alpan, Quba Rayon)
 Dilim Baba Mausoleum (Hapıt, Quba Rayon)
 Qaqash Huseyn Mausoleum (Şivlə, Lerik Rayon)
 Sumakhi Mausoleum (Digah, Absheron Rayon)
 Ahmad ibn Karim Mausoleum (Maşxan, Astara Rayon)
 Sheikh Ahmadli Mausoleum (Xəlilli, Agsu Rayon)

Bangladesh

Belgium 
Mausoleum of the Counts of Bossu, by Jacques du Broeucq.

Bosnia and Herzegovina 

 Gazi Husrev Bey mausoleum

Brunei

Bulgaria
 Battenberg Mausoleum, Sofia (1897)
 Georgi Dimitrov Mausoleum, Sofia (1949; demolished in 1999)
 St George the Conqueror Chapel Mausoleum, Pleven (1907)
 Mausoleum of the Liberators, Razgrad
 Mausoleum of Antim I, Vidin (1934)

China
 Mausoleum of the Yellow Emperor
 List of mausoleums of Chinese monarchs
 Mausoleum of the First Qin Emperor, Xi'an
 Han Yang Ling Mausoleum, tomb of Emperor Jing of Han outside Xi'an.
 Maolingtomb of Emperor Wu of Han outside Xi'an
 Zhao Mausoleum (Tang dynasty)
 Qianling Mausoleum, tomb of Emperor Gaozong of Tang outside Xi'an.
 Imperial Tombs of the Ming and Qing Dynasties
 Thirteen Imperial Mausoleums of Ming Dynasty Emperors, Beijing
 Ming Xiaoling Mausoleum, Nanjing
 Fuling Tomb, Shenyang
 Zhao Mausoleum (Qing Dynasty)
 Eastern Qing Tombs
 Western Qing Tombs
 Ancient Tombs at Longtou Mountain
 Mausoleum of Princess Zhenxiao

Croatia 

 Mausoleum of Croatian Kings
 Jelačić family tomb

Cuba

Cyprus
 Hala Sultan Tekke

Czech Republic
 Mausoleum of Yugoslavian Soldiers in Olomouc
 National Monument in Vitkov

Egypt
Ancient Egypt Mausolea:

 pyramids of ancient Egypt.
 Mastaba.
 Nubian pyramids.
 QV66.

Holy Shrines & Mausolea in Egypt

Christian Holy Shrines and Mausolea
 Monastery of Saint Macarius the Great, Shrine of Saint John the Baptist & Elisha the Prophet
 Monastery of Saint Macarius the Great, Shrine of Saints Macarius the Great, Macarius of Alexandria, Macarius of the Bishop
 Syrian Monastery, Egypt, Shrine of Mary Magdalene
 Saint Mark's Coptic Orthodox Cathedral (Alexandria), Shrine of Saint Mark the Evangelist
 Saint Mark's Coptic Orthodox Cathedral, Cairo, Shrine of Saint Athanasius
 Paromeos Monastery, Shrine of Saints Maximus & Domitius
 White Monastery, Shrine of Saint Shenouda the Archimandrite
 Convent of Saint Theodore (Harat al-Rum), Shrine of Saint Marina the Monk
 St. Abraam Coptic Orthodox Monastery, Shrine of Abraam, Bishop of Faiyum
 Monastery of Saint Mina, Shrine of Pope Cyril VI & Saint Menas
 Saint Mercurius Church in Coptic Cairo, Shrine of Mother Irini
 Monastery of Saint Pishoy, Shrine of Pope Shenouda III
 Monastery of Saint Mina, Shrine of Pope Cyril VI & Saint Menas

Islamic Holy Shrines and Mausolea
 Mausoleum of Al Mursi Abu al-Abbas, Abu al-Abbas al-Mursi Mosque in Alexandria
 Mausoleum of Abul Hasan ash-Shadhili in Sheikhhazly.
 Mausoleum of Al-Hussein, Al-Hussein Mosque in Cairo.
 Mausoleum of Al-Sayeda Nafeesah Mosque, in Cairo.
 Mausoleum of Sayyidah Zaynab, Sayyidah Zaynab Mosque in Cairo.
 Mausoleum of Al Sheikh Yusef Abu Haggag, Mosque of Abu Haggag in Luxor.

Mamluk Mausolea in Egypt
 Qalawun Mausoleum is the Mausoleum of Qalawun, Cairo, Egypt.

Mausolea of The Muhammad Ali Dynasty

 Mausoleum of Hosh al-Basha in Fustat, Cairo.
 Mausoleum of Muhammad Ali Pasha in The Great Mosque of Muhammad Ali Pasha, Citadel of Cairo, Cairo.
 Khedival Mausoleum, Al-Rifa'i Mosque, Mosque in Midan al Qal'a, Cairo.
 Mausoleum of Khedive Tawfiq, Qubbat Afandina, Afifi, Cairo.

20th Century Mausolea & Memorials in Egypt
 Mausoleum of Abdel Halim Hafez in Al-Rifa'i Mosque, Cairo.
 Mausoleum of Aga Khan III in Aswan.
 Mausoleum of Auguste Mariette in the Egyptian Museum, Cairo.
 Mausoleum of Boutros Boutros-Ghali in Petrine Church, Cairo.
 Mausoleum of Constantine P. Cavafy in the Greek Orthodox Cemetery of Alexandria.
 Mausoleum of Gamal Abdel Nasser, Gamal Abdel Nasser Mosque, in Cairo.

 Mausoleum of Naguib Mahfouz in Al-Rashdan Mosque, Madinet Nasser, Cairo.
 Mausoleum of Saad Zaghloul, Beit El-Umma, Downtown Cairo.
 Mausoleum of Youssef Chahine in family crypt of the Greek Orthodox Cemetery of Alexandria.
 Mausoleum of Umm Kulthum in Cairo.

War Memorials in Egypt

 Port Said Martyrs Memorial
 Unknown Soldier Memorial (Egypt).

Commonwealth War Graves Commission Egypt
 Alamein Memorial, Mathruh.
 El Qantara, Ismaileya.
 Alexandria (Hadra) War Memorial Cemetery.
 Heliopolis War Cemetery.

Estonia

France
 Panthéon
 Basilica of St Denis
 Les Invalides
 Père Lachaise Cemetery contains many notable examples from the classic and Ancient Egyptian-inspired memorials to Napoleon's marshals through to the modernist such as Oscar Wilde's

Finland

Germany
 Mausoleum im Schlosspark Charlottenburg
 Bismarck Mausoleum, the mausoleum of Prince Otto von Bismarck and his wife Johanna von Puttkamer.
 The Carstanjen Mausoleum, a Grecian rotunda at Haus Carstanjen, Bonn
 Floratempel, mausoleum of Carl Duisberg, Leverkusen
 Zentralfriedhof Friedrichsfelde, mausoleum of the Socialists

Hungary 
 Farkasréti Cemetery
 Kerepesi Cemetery

India
Main: Mausoleums in India

Indonesia
 Imogiri, in Java where Sultan Agung's Mausoleum has extended into a complex of descendants graves.
 Makam Bung Karno in Blitar, East Java, Indonesia
 Astana Giribangun

Iran 

Iran's Cultural Heritage Organization lists several hundred mausoleums in Iran. (See Ferdowsi and Ziyarat articles for some examples).

Iraq

Israel and Palestinian territories
 Joseph's Tomb

Italy
 Mausoleum of Augustus
 Mausoleum of Theodoric
 Castel Sant'Angelo, Hadrian mausoleum
 Pantheon, Rome
 San Cassiano cemeteryCripta Mussolini, burial place of Benito Mussolini.

Jordan

 Al-Khazneh in Petra, believed to be the mausoleum of Nabataean King Aretas IV
 Hashemite Family Cemetery, the royal cemetery of the Jordan royal family.

Kazakhstan

Kyrgyzstan

Mali

Mongolia
 Sükhbaatar's mausoleum, Ulan Bator, Mongolia
 Altan-Ölgii National Cemetery, Ulan Bator, Mongolia

Morocco

Myanmar
 Kandawmin Garden Mausolea
 Konbaung tombs
 Martyrs' Mausoleum in Yangon

Netherlands

North Korea 
 Mausoleum of Tangun
 Goguryeo tombs
 Tomb of King Tongmyong
 Royal Tombs of the Goryeo Dynasty
 Tomb of King Wanggon
 Tomb of King Kongmin

Norway 
 The Mausoleum located under the ground floor of Akershus Fortress in Oslo contains the bodies of Olav V and Haakon VII of Norway. Queen Maud of Norway and Crown Princess Märtha of Norway

Pakistan

 Abdullah Shah Ghazi Mazar (mausoleum of Karachi's sufi saint), Karachi

Philippines
 Quezon Memorial
 Aguinaldo Shrine
 Libingan ng mga Bayani
 Manila North Cemetery
 Marcos Museum and Mausoleum in Batac, Ilocos Norte, the mausoleum houses the remains of Former Philippine President Ferdinand E. Marcos.

Poland
 Mausoleum of the Grand Masters of the Teutonic Order, Ordensburg Marienburg in Malbork, Poland
 Karol Scheibler's Chapel
 Powązki Military Cemetery

Romania
 Mausoleum of Mărăşeşti
 Tropaeum Traiani

Russia 
 Cathedral of the Archangel
 Peter and Paul Cathedral
 Lenin's Mausoleum

Saudi Arabia
 Al Oud cemetery
 Al-Baqi'

Serbia
 Kuća cveća (House of the Flowers) Where comrade Marshal Josip Broz Tito was laid to rest in Belgrade.
 Oplenac, mausoleum of the Serbian Karađorđević Royal Family.

South Korea
 Royal Tombs of the Silla Dynasty
 Royal Tombs of the Joseon Dynasty
 Kim Koo Museum and Hyochang Park

Spain

Sudan

Syria

Taiwan

 Cihu Presidential Burial Place, burial place of President Chiang Kai-shek, in Daxi.
 Touliao Mausoleum, burial place of President Chiang Ching-Kuo in Daxi.

Tajikistan

Turkmenistan

Turkey 

 Roman mausoleums of Araban
 Celal Bayar Mausoleum in Bursa
 Süleyman Demirel Mausoleum

Ukraine
 Nikolay Pirogov's mausoleum (Vinnitsa)
 Grigory Kotovsky's mausoleum (destroyed in 1941 by Romanian troops).

United Kingdom
 Ailesbury Mausoleum
 Castle Howard Mausoleum, in Yorkshire, by the noted architect Hawksmoor
 Chandos Mausoleum, Harrow
 Comte de Vezlo Mausoleum, Mortlake, London
 Darnley Mausoleum, Gravesend
 De Grey Mausoleum
 Duchess of Kent's Mausoleum, Frogmore Gardens in Windsor Great Park
 Gordon Tomb, Moray, Scotland
 Hamilton Mausoleum, Hamilton, South Lanarkshire
 Hannen Columbarium, Wargrave, Berkshire
 Highgate Cemetery, London, has a collection of Victorian mausoleums
 Kilmorey Mausoleum, Richmond upon Thames, London
 Lytton Mausoleum, Knebworth Park, Hertfordshire
 Mausoleum of Sir Richard and Lady Burton, Mortlake, London
 Milton Mausoleum, Milton, Nottinghamshire
 Monteath Mausoleum, Jedburgh, Scotland
 Montefiore Synagogue, Ramsgate, Kent
 Peacock Mausoleum, Gorton, Manchester
 The Rockingham Mausoleum, Rotherham, South Yorkshire
 Rothschild Mausoleum, West Ham, London
 Frogmore Mausoleum, burial place of Victoria and Albert
 Sassoon Mausoleum, Brighton
 St George's Chapel, Windsor Castle
 Stephenson Family Mausoleum, Ballyclare, County Antrim
 Trafford Mausoleum, Wroxham
 Templeton Mausoleum of Castle Upton, Templepatrick, County Antrim, Northern Ireland
 Westminster Abbey

United States
See also List of pyramid mausoleums in North America.
 Presidents' graves
 Washington's Tomb
 Taylor Mausoleum
 Garfield Memorial
 Lincoln Tomb
 Grant's Tomb
 McKinley National Memorial
 MacArthur Memorial
 Glover Mausoleum
 Afterglow Vista
 Miles Mausoleum
 Mount Holly Mausoleum
 Ferncliff Cemetery and Mausoleum
 Queen of Heaven Mausoleum
 Forest Lawn Memorial Park
 Stanford Mausoleum
 Tacoma Mausoleum
 Tombs of the Uga mascots in Sanford Stadium
 Wainwright Tomb
 Will Rogers Shrine of the Sun

Uzbekistan
 Gur-e Amir
 Mir-Sayid Bakhrom Mausoleum
 Ak Astana-Baba
 Chashma-Ayub Mausoleum
 Arab-Ata Mausoleum

Venezuela 

 Conjunto Monumental Panteón Nacional y Mausoleo del Libertador, National Pantheon of Venezuela and Simón Bolívar's Mausoleum
 El Museo Histórico Militar de Caracas, Mausoleum of Hugo Chávez, the President of Venezuela.

Vietnam 
 Tomb of Gia Long
 Tomb of Tự Đức
 Tomb of Dục Đức
 Tomb of Khải Định

See also

 List of cemeteries
 List of memorials
 List of tombs and mausoleums
 List of monumental masons

References

External links
 List of twelve mousoleums of Khiva
 European-influenced mausolea in New Orleans

Mausolea